Zona Romántica, also known as Emiliano Zapata or Old Town, is an LGBT-friendly colonia (neighborhood) south of Centro, Puerto Vallarta, in the Mexican state of Jalisco.

Features

The  Malecón spans Centro and Zona Romántica. Beaches within Zona Romántica include Playa de los Muertos featuring Los Muertos Pier, Playa Olas Altas, and the smaller Las Amapas Beach.

Notable buildings include Iglesia de la Santa Cruz. Andale's Restaurant & Bar, The Blue Shrimp, Coco's Kitchen, El Dorado, Fredy's Tucan, La Palapa, The Pancake House, Pancho's Takos, and River Cafe are popular restaurants.

Public art in the district include Ándale Bernardo by Jim Demetro and a statue of Lázaro Cárdenas in Lázaro Cárdenas Park, as well as The Fisherman (1996) by Ramiz Barquet, The Fishermen (2018) by Jim and Christina Demetro, and The Washer Woman by Jim Demetro. Isla Cuale features Identidad  (2019) and a statue of John Huston, installed in 1988.

LGBT culture

Blue Chairs Resort by the Sea is a popular gay resort. Gay bars include CC Slaughters, La Noche, Mantamar Beach Club Bar & Sushi, Mr. Flamingo, and Paco's Ranch. Other gay-friendly establishments include Garbo, a martini bar with live music, and Ritmos Beach Cafe (nicknamed "green chairs") along Playa de los Muertos. The Palm Cabaret and Bar is a performance venue.

References

External links

 

Geography of Jalisco
LGBT in Mexico